Dyslexia-associated protein KIAA0319 is a protein which in humans is encoded by the KIAA0319 gene.

Clinical significance 

Variants of the KIAA0319 gene have been associated with developmental dyslexia. Reading disability, or dyslexia, is a major social, educational and mental health problem. In spite of average intelligence and adequate educational opportunities, 5 to 10% of school children have substantial reading deficits. Twin and family studies have shown a substantial genetic component to this disorder, with heritable variation estimated at 50 to 70%.

Mutations in the gene also more generally appear to play a key role in specific language impairment (SLI).

Function 

The KIAA0319 protein is expressed on the cell membrane and may be involved in neuronal migration. Furthermore, KIAA0319 follows a clathrin-mediated endocytic pathway.

References

Further reading

External links 
KIAA0319 Associations, Experiments, Publications and Clinical Trials

Dyslexia research